Druzhnaya is a rural locality (a village) in Navlinsky District, Bryansk Oblast, Russia. The population was 13 as of 2010. There is 1 street.

Geography 
Druzhnaya is located 20 km north of Navlya (the district's administrative centre) by road. Chichkovo is the nearest rural locality.

References 

Rural localities in Navlinsky District